Paul Bennett may refer to:

Paul Bennett (Canadian football) (born 1954), Canadian football player
Paul Bennett (footballer, born 1952), English footballer
Paul Bennett (footballer, born 1961), English footballer
Paul Bennett (rower) (born 1988), British Olympic gold medal-winning rower
Paul Bennett (Royal Navy officer), British admiral
Paul Bennett (typographer) (1897–1966), American author and typographer
 Paul Bennett, pseudonym of Paul Begaud (active from 1996), Australian songwriter, record producer and singer
Rev. Paul Bennett, a vicar who was stabbed to death in the churchyard of St Fagan's Church (Trecynon, Wales) in 2007
Paul Bennett, tennis player, see List of Canada Davis Cup team representatives
Paul Bennett, a character in the television series Dexter